Seydou Saeed Issah (born 11 January 2000) is a Ghanaian professional footballer who plays as a defender for Liga I club FC Hermannstadt.

References

External links
 

2000 births
Living people
Footballers from Accra
Association football defenders
Segunda División B players
Real Valladolid Promesas players
Liga I players
Liga II players
FC Hermannstadt players
Ghanaian expatriate footballers
Ghanaian expatriate sportspeople in Spain
Expatriate footballers in Spain
Ghanaian expatriate sportspeople in Romania
Expatriate footballers in Romania
Ghanaian footballers